Eucheilota is a genus of cnidarians belonging to the family Lovenellidae.

The genus has almost cosmopolitan distribution.

Species

Species:

Eucheilota bakeri 
Eucheilota birabeni 
Eucheilota bitentaculata

References

Lovenellidae
Hydrozoan genera